Ivan Jerković (born 13 January 1979) is a Croatian professional footballer who last played in Singapore for DPMM FC, as a midfielder.

Career
Jerković has played club football in Indonesia and Singapore for Pelita Jaya, Brunei DPMM and Singapore Armed Forces.

Honours

Team
 2012 Singapore League Cup Champions with DPMM FC
 2012 S.League Runner-Up with DPMM FC

References

1979 births
Living people
Croatian footballers
Croatian expatriate footballers
Croatian expatriate sportspeople in Indonesia
Croatian expatriate sportspeople in Singapore
Expatriate footballers in Indonesia
Expatriate footballers in Singapore
Expatriate footballers in Brunei
Pelita Bandung Raya players
Warriors FC players
DPMM FC players
Singapore Premier League players
Association football midfielders